The 1959–60 Washington Huskies men's basketball team represented the University of Washington for the 1959–60 NCAA University Division basketball season. Led by first-year head coach John Grayson, the Huskies were members of the Athletic Association of Western Universities (Big Five) and played their home games on campus at Hec Edmundson Pavilion in Seattle, Washington.

Grayson was hired in July 1959, following the departure of Tippy Dye in June to become athletic director at Wichita State. Grayson was the head coach at Idaho State, formerly of the Rocky Mountain Conference, and had led the Bengals to the NCAA tournament in 1957 with a  regular season record; he coached the Husky program for 

Following the season in May 1960, assistant (and alumnus) Joe Cipriano became the head coach at independent Idaho. After a successful  season on the Palouse with the Vandals in 1963, he rejoined Dye at Nebraska of the Big Eight Conference, and guided the Huskers for

References

External links
Sports Reference – Washington Huskies: 1959–60 basketball season

Washington Huskies men's basketball seasons
Washington Huskies
Washington
Washington